Remipedia is a class of blind crustaceans found in coastal aquifers which contain saline groundwater, with populations identified in almost every ocean basin so far explored, including in Australia, the Caribbean Sea, and the Atlantic Ocean. The first described remipede was the fossil Tesnusocaris goldichi (Lower Pennsylvanian). Since 1979, at least seventeen living species have been identified in subtropical regions around the world.

Description
Pigmentation and eyes are absent. Biramous swimming appendages are laterally present on each segment. The animals swim on their backs and are generally slow-moving. They are the only known venomous crustaceans, and have fangs connected to secretory glands, which inject a combination of digestive enzymes and venom into their prey, but they also feed through filter feeding. Being hermaphrodites, the female pore is located on the seventh trunk segment and the male pore on the fourteenth.

Remipedia have a generally primitive body plan compared to other extant crustaceans, and are the only extant pancrustaceans to lack significant postcephalic tagmosis. Previously regarded as 'primitive', remipedia have since been shown to have enhanced olfactory nerve centers (a common feature for species that live in dark environments).

Based on studies of the free-living larvae, they appear to be lecithotrophic (non-feeding). Mouths, guts, and anuses appear in the juvenile stage. Because of the energy and nutrients required for swimming, molt several times and to grow in size and length, it has been speculated that the larvae may have other sources of growth than its yolk, possibly symbiotic bacteria.

History of classification 
The class Remipedia was erected in 1981 by Jill Yager, in describing Speleonectes lucayensis from the Bahamas. The name "Remipedia" is from the Latin , meaning "oar-footed".

Historical phylogeny based on morphology and physiology has placed Remipedia under Mandibulata, in the subphylum Crustacea, and distinct from Hexapoda.

New research in evolution and development reveals similarities between larvae and postembryonic development of remipedes and Malacostraca, singling Remipedia as a potential crustacean sister group of Hexapoda. Similarities in brain anatomy further support this affinity, and hexapod-type hemocyanins have been discovered in remipedes.

Recent molecular studies have grouped Remipedia with Cephalocarida, Branchiopoda, and Hexapoda in a clade named Allotriocarida. Remipedia was found as the sister group to Hexapoda both in phylogenomic  and combined morphological and transcriptome studies. In other studies Remipedia and Cephalocarida are grouped together form the clade Xenocarida, which in turn was sister to Hexapoda in a clade named Anartiopoda or Miracrustacea ('surprising crustaceans'). 

The relationship of Remipedia and other crustacean classes and insects is shown in the following phylogenetic tree, which shows Allotriocarida, along with Oligostraca and Multicrustacea, as the three main divisions of subphylum Pancrustacea, embracing the traditional crustaceans and the hexapods (including insects).

Classification

Thirty extant species are recognized as of early 2022, divided among eight families and twelve genera.  All are placed in the order Nectiopoda. The second order, Enantiopoda, comprises the fossil species Tesnusocaris goldichi and Cryptocaris hootchi.

 †Order Enantiopoda Birshtein 1960
 †Family Tesnusocarididae Brooks 1955 [Cryptocarididae Sieg 1980]
 Genus †Tesnusocaris Brooks 1955
 †Tesnusocaris goldichi Brooks 1955
 Genus †Cryptocaris Emerson & Schram 1985
 †Cryptocaris hootchi Emerson & Schram 1985
 Order Nectiopoda Schram 1986
Family Micropacteridae Koenemann, Iliffe & van der Ham 2007
 Genus Micropacter Koenemann, Iliffe & van der Ham 2007
 Micropacter yagerae Koenemann, Iliffe & van der Ham 2007
 Family Godzilliidae Schram, Yager & Emerson 1986
 Genus Godzilliognomus Yager 1989
 Godzilliognomus frondosus Yager, 1989
 Godzillognomus schrami Iliffe, Otten & Koenemann 2010
 Genus Godzillius Schram et al., 1986
 Godzillius fuchsi Gonzalez, Singpiel & Schlagner 2013
 Godzillius robustus Schram, Yager & Emerson 1986
 Family Kumongidae Hoenemann et al. 2013
 Genus Kumonga Hoenemann et al. 2013
 Kumonga exleyi (Yager & Humphreys 1996) Hoenemann et al. 2013 [Lasionectes exleyi Yager & Humphreys 1996]
 Family Cryptocorynetidae Hoenemann et al. 2013
 Genus Kaloketos Koenemann, Iliffe & Yager 2004
 Kaloketos pilosus Koenemann, Iliffe & Yager 2004
 Genus Angirasu Hoenemann et al. 2013
 Angirasu benjamini (Yager 1987) Hoenemann et al. 2013 [Speleonectes benjamini Yager 1987]
 Angirasu parabenjamini (Koenemann, Iliffe & van der Ham 2003) Hoenemann et al. 2013 [Speleonectes parabenjamini Koenemann, Iliffe & van der Ham 2003]
 Genus Cryptocorynetes Yager 1987
 Cryptocorynetes elmorei Hazerli, Koenemann & Iliffe 2009 
 Cryptocorynetes haptodiscus Yager 1987
 Cryptocorynetes longulus Wollermann, Koenemann & Iliffe 2007
 Family Morlockiidae García-Valdecasas 1984
 Genus Morlockia García-Valdecasas 1984
 Morlockia williamsi (Hartke, Koenemann & Yager 2011) [Speleonectes williamsi Hartke, Koenemann & Yager 2011]
 Morlockia emersoni (Lorentzen, Koenemann & Iliffe 2007) [Speleonectes emersoni Lorentzen, Koenemann & Iliffe 2007]
 Morlockia atlantida (Koenemann et al. 2009) Hoenemann et al. 2012 [Speleonectes atlantidus Koenemann et al. 2009]
 Morlockia ondinae García-Valdecasas 1984 [Speleonectes ondinae (Garcia-Valdecasas 1984)]
 Family Speleonectidae Yager 1981
 Genus Lasionectes Yager & Schram, 1986
 Lasionectes entrichoma Yager & Schram, 1986
 Genus Speleonectes Yager 1981
 Speleonectes cokei Yager, 2013
 Speleonectes epilimnius Yager & Carpenter, 1999
 Speleonectes gironensis Yager, 1994
 Speleonectes kakukii Daenekas et al., 2009
 Speleonectes lucayensis Yager, 1981
 Speleonectes minnsi Koenemann, Iliffe & van der Ham, 2003
 Speleonectes tanumekes Koenemann, Iliffe & van der Ham, 2003
 Family Xibalbanidae Olesen et al. 2017
 Genus Xibalbanus Hoenemann et al. 2013
 Xibalbanus cokei  (Yager, 2013)
 Xibalbanus cozumelensis Olesen, Meland, Glenner, van Hengstum & Iliffe, 2017
 Xibalbanus fuchscockburni (Neiber et al. 2012) Hoenemann et al. 2013 [Speleonectes fuchscockburni Neiber et al. 2012]
 Xibalbanus tulumensis (Yager 1987) Hoenemann et al. 2013 [Speleonectes tulumensis Yager 1987]
 Family Pleomothridae Hoenemann et al. 2013
 Genus Pleomothra Yager 1989
 Pleomothra apletocheles Yager 1989
 Pleomothra fragilis Koenemann, Ziegler & Iliffe 2008

Geographic distribution of extant Remipedia
 – Andros, Sweetings Cay, Grand Bahama, Great Exuma, Great Guana Cay (Exuma Cays), Cat Island, Abaco Islands, San Salvador Island
 – North Caicos, Providenciales
 – North West Cape (Western Australia)
 – Matanzas Province
 – Lanzarote (Canary Islands)
 – Quintana Roo
Belize - Caye_Chapel
 – Distrito Nacional Cueva Taína, Santo Domingo Este.

References

External links

 

 
Arthropod classes
Extant Pennsylvanian first appearances